BSG Chemie Leipzig is a German football club based in the locality of Leutzsch of the Alt-West borough of Leipzig, Saxony. It continues the traditions of the original club of the same name and its successor FC Sachsen Leipzig.

History

Predecessors

The prewar identity of the club is rooted in the establishment of Britannia Leipzig in 1899 and its successor TuRa Leipzig. During the Soviet era the traditions of the club were continued in the East German teams BSG Chemie Leipzig and Lokomotive Leipzig before the emergence of FC Sachsen Leipzig following German reunification, which continued the clubs traditions.

BSG Chemie Leipzig shares the same logo and the same colours as the previously existing BSG Chemie Leipzig, founded on 16 August 1950.

FC Sachsen Leipzig was founded in 1990. The reunification of East and West Germany saw significant change in football in the eastern half of the country. At the end of May 1990, the club was renamed FC Grün-Weiß Leipzig and quickly merged with SV Chemie Böhlen (formerly BSG Chemie Böhlen) to create FC Sachsen in August of that year and took up play in the Oberliga Nordost (III).

In March 2009, the club had to declare bankruptcy for the second time in its history before folding on 30 June 2011.

Establishment and race to become the successor club
Two new sides soon appeared, both claiming to be the rightful heirs of the tradition of FC Sachsen. Founded on 21 May 2011, SG Leipzig Leutzsch took up the place of Sachsen in league play and moved into the ground at Alfred-Kunze-Sportpark. In mid-2013 the club re-adopted the name SG Sachsen Leipzig, but their financial difficulties continued and on 5 May 2014 the association went bankrupt again. However, the name Sachsen Leipzig was soon taken up again by a new club, the LFV Sachsen Leipzig, founded in 2014. LFV Sachsen Leipzig is playing the 2015-16 season in the 3. Kreisklasse. The team secured promotion to the 2016-17 2. Kreisklasse on 1 May 2016.

A new BSG Chemie Leipzig was founded in 1997 and the team began play in the lowest tier city competition, 3. Kreissklasse Leipzig, in 2008-09. That club won three successive promotions and quickly advanced to 6th-tier play after acquiring the place held by VfK Blau-Weiß Leipzig in the Sachsenliga with Blau-Weiß dropping down to 8th tier Stadtliga Leipzig, and by 2011-12 was playing alongside SG Sachsen in the regional Sachsenliga. Their progress stalled in 2013 when they slipped to Bezirkliga play for a single season.

Despite the fact that both clubs see themselves as the sole legitimate successors to the club that failed in 2009, they have agreed to cooperate at the youth level to help ensure that sporting opportunities remain available to area youth. They also hope to preserve and build on the historical tradition represented by Chemie and Sachsen.

In May 2014 it was announced that both clubs cooperated in the future at the junior level, as the SG Sachsen (the main tenant in the stadium) is insolvent, and the employed administrators decided the ultimate direction of the club. The ultimate goal was the survival of the Association, so that at least the youth teams of SG Sachsen were secured. In their press release it was called among others: "No matter what decision the liquidator of SG Sachsen in terms of the insolvency proceedings: BSG Chemie Leipzig will ensure that children and young people can play football even after 30 June in the Alfred-Kunze-Sportpark!".

Rise through the leagues
The club had the overwhelming vast majority of the support of the traditional fans of Chemie, unlike the other attempted successor sides. After starting in the 12th division, the club rose through the amateur divisions, winning promotion to the 4th division in the 2016–17 season in front of officially 4999 fans in a match against SV Schott Jena.

Supporters
The launch of the new BSG Chemie was mostly pushed ahead by younger fans of FC Sachsen Leipzig, especially the ultras group Diablos Leutzsch, who are expressly anti-fascist and tend to hold left-wing views. They were rejected by more seasoned FC Sachsen fans and the club management who described themselves as apolitical but were accused by Diablos and others from the younger, leftist field of being lenient toward racists. These elder supporters denied the new BSG's claim of being the legitimate heir to the original club of the same name active in the pre-1990 era. FC Sachsen and BSG Chemie fans both used the sobriquet Chemiker (i.e. "chemists").

The club's fans share a fierce and often violent rivalry with the supporters of 1. FC Lokomotive Leipzig. When both teams met in the quarter finals of the Sachsenpokal in 2016, German daily newspaper Die Welt called the match the "German hooligan summit". An additional reason for the enmity between certain fans of the two clubs is a political one. The above-mentioned leftist and anti-fascist Chemie supporters and ultras are confronted with vocal groups of Lok fans from the right and far-right of the political spectrum. Chemie also have lesser local rivalry with RB Leipzig.

Current squad

Honours
 Sachsenliga
 Champions: 2015–16
 NOFV-Oberliga Süd
 Champions: 2016–17, 2018–19
 Saxony Cup
 Champions: 2017-18

League history

References

External links
 

Leipzig Chemie
Football clubs in Saxony
Sport in Leipzig
Association football clubs established in 1997
1997 establishments in Germany